Edgeland is the debut solo album by Underworld member Karl Hyde. It was released on 19 April 2013 by Universal Music. The album debuted at number 117 on the UK Albums Chart.

Critical reception

Edgeland received positive reviews from music critics. At Metacritic, which assigns a normalised rating out of 100 to reviews from mainstream critics, the album received an average score of 72, based on 11 reviews, which indicates "generally favorable reviews".

Track listing

Charts

References

2013 debut albums
Albums produced by Leo Abrahams
Universal Records albums
Electronic albums by English artists